The Diocese of Knoxville is a Latin Church ecclesiastical territory or diocese of the Catholic Church in Tennessee. It was founded on May 27, 1988 from the eastern counties of the Diocese of Nashville. This diocese covers most of East Tennessee; in addition to the see city of Knoxville, it includes Chattanooga and Johnson City. The Mother Church is the Cathedral of the Most Sacred Heart of Jesus, located on Northshore Drive in Knoxville. The two oldest churches are Saints Peter and Paul Basilica Parish of Chattanooga and Church of the Immaculate Conception Parish of Knoxville, both founded in 1852.

The percentage of Catholic adherents within the diocese's borders constitutes the lowest among American dioceses. The Diocese of Knoxville is a suffragan diocese in the ecclesiastical province of the metropolitan Archdiocese of Louisville.

Demographics
With a population of 70,000 Catholics, the diocese makes up about 2.8% percent of East Tennessee's total population. The diocese is currently home to 50 parishes and one mission. These parishes are served by 65 diocesan priests, 15 religious priests, 8 extern priests, 77 deacons, 9 brothers, and 45 sisters. Eleven Religious Institutes are represented in the diocese.

Perpetual adoration of the Most Blessed Sacrament is available at many of the parishes and Masses are celebrated in a wide array of languages. This is chosen so that the spiritual needs of all parishioners are met. These languages include English, Spanish, Vietnamese, Korean, American Sign Language, Polish, and Latin.

With the influx of large numbers of Hispanic Catholics looking for work, the diocese faces many new challenges. If the estimates are correct and there are about 50,000 new Hispanic immigrants in the area, their number nearly doubles the area's current official Catholic population. The clergy and laity of the diocese are working to welcome these new neighbors.

History

While the Catholic Church has been a part of life in East Tennessee for over 166 years, the Diocese of Knoxville was founded in 1988. Before the creation, the area was part of the Diocese of Nashville.

Because of his role in the creation of the Diocese, Nashville's Bishop James Daniel Niedergeses, was known as the "Grandfather of the Diocese of Knoxville"

Father Patrick Ryan 
Father Patrick Ryan served as pastor of Sts. Peter and Paul Parish in Chattanooga from 1872 to 1878. He died from yellow fever on Sept. 28, 1878 at the age of 33. Father Ryan is described by an eyewitness as "going from house to house in the worst-infected section of the city to find what he could do for the sick and needy." In 2016, the Diocese began a cause of canonization of Father Ryan. In 2021, his remains were transferred from Mount Olivet Cemetery to Saints Peter and Paul Basilica.

Sexual abuse cases
On April 16, 2010, Bishop Richard Stika of the Diocese revoked the ministerial privileges of William Casey, a priest who formerly served in the diocese. Casey had been accused of rape and sexual abuse by a young altar boy. When confronted, Casey admitted his crimes to Stika and other diocesan officials. Casey was convicted in July 2011 of first-degree sexual misconduct and two counts of aggravated rape and sentenced to prison. The Vatican laicized Casey on January 10, 2013.

On January 1, 2020, the Diocese settled a sex abuse lawsuit involving a man who claimed two priests in the Diocese sexually abused him as a child in the 1990s. Those accused were Monsignor Francis Xavier Mankel and the Diocese of Knoxville's first Bishop Anthony O'Connell; O'Connell previously confessed in 2002 to committing acts of sex abuse before he joined the Diocese of Knoxville as well. The terms of the settlement were not disclosed. Originally filed in the Knox County Circuit Court, both parties involved in the lawsuit agreed to instead settle the lawsuit out of court. Despite denying any wrongdoing concerning the two accused priests, who are both dead, the Diocese agreed to settle due to the financial burden which would have grown by continuing the lawsuit.

In February 2021, a lawsuit filed against both Stika and the Diocese of Knoxville alleged that Wojciech Sobczuk, a Polish seminarian who Stika had invited to study to become a priest in the diocese, raped and sexually harassed an organist employed by Sacred Heart Cathedral. Prior to becoming a seminarian, Sobczuk had been dismissed from the Jesuits after accusations of sexual misconduct at SS. Cyril and Methodius Seminary. Shortly following the alleged rape, Sobczuk moved into the bishop's rectory and was sent to St. Meinrad Seminary, being dismissed after multiple other allegations of sexual misconduct there. He remained classified as a seminarian of the diocese, which could be construed as immigration fraud, and returned to living in the episcopal residence. Due to the alleged assault, diocesan officials appointed an investigator, who was dismissed by Stika seemingly for contacting diocesan and seminary officials with questions. The replacement investigator Stika appointed interviewed only Sobczuk before closing his investigation.

In July 2022, the diocese successfully sought to de-anonymize the victim in court proceedings, going against prior diocesan policy to respect victim privacy. It also attempted to place internal church documents under clergy-penitent privilege and the pontifical secret, going against prior instructions by the Holy See.

In April 2022, Fr. Anthony D. Punnackal, a priest of the Congregation of the Carmelites of Mary Immaculate (CMI) serving in the Diocese, was accused of 'one count of sexual battery and one count of sexual battery by an authority figure' during a grief counseling session.

COVID-19 response 
Public Masses were suspended on March 20, 2020, in response to the COVID-19 pandemic. On May 6, 2020, Bishop Stika issued a decree for the resumption of public Masses with protocols to reduce spread of the virus, including directives which prohibit the reception of Holy Communion on the tongue.

Coat of Arms

Bishops

Bishops of Knoxville
The following is a list of bishops along with their dates of service:
 Anthony Joseph O'Connell (1988–1998), appointed Bishop of Palm Beach
 Joseph Edward Kurtz (1999–2007), appointed Archbishop of Louisville
 Richard Stika (2009–present)

Other priest of this diocese who became bishop
 James Vann Johnston Jr. appointed Bishop of Springfield-Cape Girardeau and later Bishop of Kansas City-Saint Joseph

Education

High schools
 Knoxville Catholic High School (web page)
 Notre Dame High School (Chattanooga) (web page)

See also

 Catholic Church by country
 Catholic Church hierarchy
 List of the Catholic dioceses of the United States

References

External links 
 
 The East Tennessee Catholic Online
 Archdiocese of Louisville

 
Christian organizations established in 1988
Christianity in Tennessee
Catholic Church in Tennessee
Knoxville
Knoxville
Roman Catholic Ecclesiastical Province of Louisville
1988 establishments in Tennessee
Organizations based in Knoxville, Tennessee